Fire Under the Snow is a 2008 documentary film on the life of Tibetan monk Palden Gyatso, recounting 33 years of his life spent as a political prisoner in Chinese prisons and labor camps. The documentary is directed by Japanese filmmaker Makoto Sasa and based on the book by Palden Gyatso in Tibetan language.

References 

2008 films
2008 documentary films
Documentary films about spirituality
Documentary films about Buddhism
Documentary films about Tibet